A trauma center (or trauma centre) is a hospital equipped and staffed to provide care for patients suffering from major traumatic injuries such as falls, motor vehicle collisions, or gunshot wounds. A trauma center may also refer to an emergency department (also known as a "casualty department" or "accident and emergency") without the presence of specialized services to care for victims of major trauma.

In the United States, a hospital can receive trauma center status by meeting specific criteria established by the American College of Surgeons (ACS) and passing a site review by the Verification Review Committee. Official designation as a trauma center is determined by individual state law provisions. Trauma centers vary in their specific capabilities and are identified by "Level" designation: Level I (Level-1) being the highest and Level III (Level-3) being the lowest (some states have five designated levels, in which case Level V (Level-5) is the lowest).

The highest levels of trauma centers have access to specialist medical and nursing care, including emergency medicine, trauma surgery, critical care, neurosurgery, orthopedic surgery, anesthesiology, and radiology, as well as a wide variety of highly specialized and sophisticated surgical and diagnostic equipment. Lower levels of trauma centers may be able to provide only initial care and stabilization of a traumatic injury and arrange for transfer of the patient to a higher level of trauma care.

The operation of a trauma center is often expensive and some areas may be underserved by trauma centers because of that expense. As there is no way to schedule the need for emergency services, patient traffic at trauma centers can vary widely.

A trauma center may have a helipad for receiving patients that have been airlifted to the hospital. In some cases, persons injured in remote areas and transported to a distant trauma center by helicopter can receive faster and better medical care than if they had been transported by ground ambulance to a closer hospital that does not have a designated trauma center.

History

United Kingdom
Trauma centres grew into existence out of the realisation that traumatic injury is a disease process unto itself requiring specialised and experienced multidisciplinary treatment and specialised resources. The world's first trauma centre, the first hospital to be established specifically to treat injured rather than ill patients, was the Birmingham Accident Hospital, which opened in Birmingham, England in 1941 after a series of studies found that the treatment of injured persons within England was inadequate. By 1947, the hospital had three trauma teams, each including two surgeons and an anaesthetist, and a burns team with three surgeons. The hospital became part of the National Health Service in its formation in July 1948 and closed in 1993. The NHS now has 27 major trauma centres established across England, four in Scotland, and one planned in Wales.

United States

According to the CDC, injuries are the leading cause of death for American children and young adults ages 1–19. The leading causes of trauma are motor vehicle collisions, falls, and assaults with a deadly weapon.

In the United States, Robert J. Baker and Robert J. Freeark established the first civilian Shock Trauma Unit at Cook County Hospital in Chicago, Illinois on March 16, 1966. The concept of a shock trauma center was also developed at the University of Maryland, Baltimore, in the 1950s and 1960s by thoracic surgeon and shock researcher R Adams Cowley, who founded what became the Shock Trauma Center in Baltimore, Maryland, on July 1, 1966. The R Adams Cowley Shock Trauma Center is one of the first shock trauma centers in the world. Cook County Hospital in Chicago trauma center (opened in 1966). David R. Boyd interned at Cook County Hospital from 1963 to 1964 before being drafted into the Army of the United States of America. Upon his release from the Army, Boyd became the first shock-trauma fellow at the R Adams Cowley Shock Trauma Center, and then went on to develop the National System for Emergency Medical Services, under President Ford. In 1968 the American Trauma Society was created by various co-founders to include R Adams Cowley, Rene Joyeuse as they saw the importance of increased education and training of emergency providers and for nationwide quality trauma care.

Canada
According to the founder of the Trauma Unit at Sunnybrook Health Sciences Centre in Toronto, Ontario, Marvin Tile, "the nature of injuries at Sunnybrook has changed over the years. When the trauma center first opened in 1976, about 98 percent of patients suffered from blunt-force trauma caused by accidents and falls. Now, as many as 20 percent of patients arrive with gunshot and knife wounds".

Fraser Health Authority in British Columbia, located at Royal Columbian Hospital and Abbotsford Regional Hospital, services the BC area, "Each year, Fraser Health treats almost 130,000 trauma patients as part of the integrated B.C. trauma system".

Definitions in United States

In the United States, trauma centers are ranked by the American College of Surgeons (ACS) or local state governments, from Level I (comprehensive service) to Level III (limited-care). The different levels refer to the types of resources available in a trauma center and the number of patients admitted yearly. These are categories that define national standards for trauma care in hospitals. Level I and Level II designations are also given adult or pediatric designations. Additionally, some states have their own trauma-center rankings separate from the ACS. These levels may range from Level I to Level IV. Some hospitals are less-formally designated Level V.

The ACS does not officially designate hospitals as trauma centers. Numerous U.S. hospitals that are not verified by ACS claim trauma center designation. Most states have legislation that determines the process for designation of trauma centers within that state. The ACS describes this responsibility as "a geopolitical process by which empowered entities, government or otherwise, are authorized to designate." The ACS's self-appointed mission is limited to confirming and reporting on any given hospital's ability to comply with the ACS standard of care known as Resources for Optimal Care of the Injured Patient.

The Trauma Information Exchange Program (TIEP) is a program of the American Trauma Society in collaboration with the Johns Hopkins Center for Injury Research and Policy and is funded by the Centers for Disease Control and Prevention. TIEP maintains an inventory of trauma centers in the US, collects data and develops information related to the causes, treatment and outcomes of injury, and facilitates the exchange of information among trauma care institutions, care providers, researchers, payers and policymakers.

Note that a trauma center is a hospital that is designated by a state or local authority or is verified by the American College of Surgeons.

Level I 
A Level I trauma center provides the highest level of surgical care to trauma patients. Being treated at a Level I trauma center can reduce mortality by 25% compared to a non-trauma center. It has a full range of specialists and equipment available 24 hours a day and admits a minimum required annual volume of severely injured patients.

A Level I trauma center is required to have a certain number of the following people on duty 24 hours a day at the hospital:
 surgeons
 emergency physicians
 anesthesiologists
 nurses
 respiratory therapists
 an education program
 preventive and outreach programs.

Key elements include 24‑hour in‑house coverage by general surgeons and prompt availability of care in varying specialties—such as orthopedic surgery, cardiothoracic surgery, neurosurgery, plastic surgery, anesthesiology, emergency medicine, radiology, internal medicine, otolaryngology, oral and maxillofacial surgery, and critical care, which are needed to adequately respond and care for various forms of trauma that a patient may suffer, as well as provide rehabilitation services.

Most Level I trauma centers are teaching hospitals/campuses. Additionally, a Level I center has a program of research, is a leader in trauma education and injury prevention, and is a referral resource for communities in nearby regions.

Level II 
A Level II trauma center works in collaboration with a Level I center. It provides comprehensive trauma care and supplements the clinical expertise of a Level I institution. It provides 24-hour availability of all essential specialties, personnel, and equipment. Oftentimes, level II centers possess critical care services capable of caring for almost all injury types indefinitely. Minimum volume requirements may depend on local conditions. Such institutions are not required to have an ongoing program of research or a surgical residency program.

Level III 
A Level III trauma center does not have the full availability of specialists but has resources for emergency resuscitation, surgery, and intensive care of most trauma patients. A Level III center has transfer agreements with Level I or Level II trauma centers that provide back-up resources for the care of patients with exceptionally severe injuries (such as multiple trauma).

Level IV 
A Level IV trauma center exists in some states in which the resources do not exist for a Level III trauma center. It provides initial evaluation, stabilization, diagnostic capabilities, and transfer to a higher level of care. It may also provide surgery and critical-care services, as defined in the scope of services for trauma care. A trauma-trained nurse is immediately available, and physicians are available upon the patient's arrival in the Emergency Department. Transfer agreements exist with other trauma centers of higher levels, for use when conditions warrant a transfer.

Level V 
A Level V trauma center provides initial evaluation, stabilization, diagnostic capabilities, and transfer to a higher level of care. They may provide surgical and critical-care services, as defined in the service's scope of trauma care services. A trauma-trained nurse is immediately available, and physicians are available upon patient arrival in the emergency department. If not open 24 hours daily, the facility must have an after-hours trauma response protocol.

Pediatric trauma centers 
A facility can be designated an adult trauma center, a pediatric trauma center, or an adult and pediatric trauma center. If a hospital provides trauma care to both adult and pediatric patients, the level designation may not be the same for each group. For example, a Level I adult trauma center may also be a Level II pediatric trauma center because pediatric trauma surgery is a specialty unto itself. Adult trauma surgeons are not generally specialized in providing surgical trauma care to children and vice versa, and the difference in practice is significant. In contrast to adult trauma centers, pediatric trauma centers only have two ratings, either level I or level II.

See also 

 List of trauma centers in the United States
 Emergency medicine
 Trauma (medicine)
 Trauma surgery
 Trauma team
 Traumatology

References

External links 
 Injury Prevention & Control: Trauma Care at Centers for Disease Control and Prevention
 Trauma Centers Fact Sheet at Centers for Disease Control and Prevention
 Trauma Levels Explained, American Trauma Society
 FACS Verified Trauma Center Listing in the United States—American College of Surgeons
 Trauma Center Association of America, formerly known as the National Foundation for Trauma Care
 U.S. Trauma Center Crisis Report (2004)
 Report: U.S. Trauma Center Preparedness for a Terrorist Attack in the Community
 Report: Harris Poll: Trauma Care: Public's Knowledge and Perception of Importance 2004
 NHS England major trauma centres 
 NHS England 2012 major trauma centres map Urgent and emergency care services
 NHS England Ambulance trauma coding When to call 999
 NHS Wales trauma centres Accident and emergency departments
 NHS Scotland trauma centres list

State trauma system regulation 
 Bureau of Emergency Medical Services & Trauma System, Arizona Department of Health Services
 Arizona Trauma Center Designation
 Arizona Trauma System
 Georgia Trauma Commission
 PA Trauma Systems Foundation
 25 Texas Administrative Code 157.125 (Texas Requirements for Trauma Facility Designation)
 Maryland Trauma System

 
Traumatology
Emergency medicine
Trauma surgery
Hospital departments